Charles Hamilton Bromby (17 July 1843 – 24 July 1904), BA LCL was an Attorney-General in the colonial Tasmanian government.

Early life
Bromby was the second son of Right Rev. Charles Henry Bromby, Bishop of Tasmania, by Mary Anne, eldest daughter of the late William Hulme Bodley, of Brighton, Sussex. He was born at Cheltenham, Gloucestershire, on 17 July 1843, and educated at Cheltenham College and St. Edmund's Hall, Oxford, where he graduated.

Legal and political career
He entered as a student of the Inner Temple on 7 June 1864, and was called to the bar on 18 November 1867. He emigrated to Tasmania, where he arrived in December 1874, and was M.H.A. for Central Launceston from 1876 to 1877, for Norfolk Plains from 1877 to 1878, and subsequently for Richmond. Bromby was Attorney-General in Reibey's Ministry, and a member of the Executive Council from 20 July 1876, to 9 August 1877. He was admitted a member of the bar of New South Wales in 1881; before returning to England, and practising as a barrister in London and on the North-Eastern Circuit. He edited Spike's Law of Master and Servant, 3rd edition.

Personal life
Bromby married Mary Ellen Hensman.  He died 24 July 1904, in St. Marylebone, London, England.

References

1843 births
1904 deaths
Attorneys-General of Tasmania
Members of the Tasmanian House of Assembly
Alumni of St Edmund Hall, Oxford
19th-century Australian politicians
British emigrants to colonial Australia